The men's 5000 metres event at the 1987 Pan American Games was held in Indianapolis, United States on 13 August.

Results

*Terry Brahm originally finished second in 13:37.56 but was later disqualified for being helped by his lapped compatriot Doug Padilla (also disqualified).

References

Athletics at the 1987 Pan American Games
1987